is a vertically scrolling shooter arcade video game by Konami released in 1990. It was published in the US and Europe as Lightning Fighters.

Development 
The three composers for the game were also working on the music for the Famicom title Crisis Force.

It was released in arcades in May 1990.

Plot 
A gigantic alien spacecraft crash lands into a future Earth, carrying an army of alien warriors with it. The precise reason as to why or how the ship arrived is never revealed though their intention is made very clear: led by some sort of a self-aware biomechanical life form, the aliens directly attacked Earth and the only thing that was able to stop them were a pair of prototype starfighters with extremely advanced equipment including a "dragon laser" which was some form of self-aware life form in the form of a fiery dragon, seen on the title screen and box cover.

Reception 
In Japan, Game Machine listed Trigon on their June 15, 1990 issue as being the fifth most popular table arcade unit at the time.

Legacy 
Though Trigon has become an obscure arcade-only title, Konami has referenced it multiple times over the years. Gradius Gaiden features a boss modeled after the ship and weapons from the game, and Yu-Gi-Oh! cards such as "Trigon", "Delta Tri" (based on the mentioned Gradius Gaiden boss), and "Dragon Laser" also represent the game. It runs the same hardware as the Teenage Mutant Ninja Turtles arcade game.

It was eventually re-released for the first time as part of Hamster Corporation's Arcade Archives series on Nintendo Switch and PlayStation 4 on August 20, 2020.

References 

Arcade video games
Arcade-only video games
Vertically scrolling shooters
1990 video games
Konami games
Konami arcade games
Video games developed in Japan